The MV Porto was a Portuguese-owned cruise ship. She had operated by Portuscale Cruises until sold for scrap in 2017.

The ship was built in 1965, as the Istra. She was purchased by Arcadia Shipping Company, Lisbon in 2000 and was completely reconstructed from the hull up, being renamed Arion. She was put in service with Classic International Cruises

On 17 September 2012 reports announced that she was detained in Montenegro for failure to pay fuel costs. Fellow ships Athena and Princess Danae were detained for similar issues.

Following the liquidation of Classic International Cruises, Arion was purchased by a Portuguese entrepreneur and remained flagged under the Portuguese flag. The ship was renamed Porto in 2013, and operated by the Portuguese cruise company Portuscale Cruises.

In 2017, the ship was sold for €1.05 million for scrapping  and broken up on 5 November 2018 at Aliaga.

References

External links 
 Details
 MS Arion cruise|
 Original photos of Istra

1964 ships
Cruise ships of Portugal
Ships built in Croatia